Scourie, historically spelled "Scoury", is a village on the north west coast of Scotland, about halfway between Ullapool and Durness. The name comes from the Gaelic word Sheiling or shed, a stone-built place of shelter used during the summer months. It is in the traditional county of Sutherland, now part of the Highland council area; the 2011 Census classified Scourie as 'Very remote rural' with an adult population of 132.

Until the 19th century, Clan Mackay was the predominant family in the area with a junior branch of the family owning Scourie itself; in 1640, it was the birthplace of Hugh Mackay, a Scottish general who settled in the Netherlands and commanded the forces of William III at Killiecrankie in July 1689. The last of the Mackays' Scottish estates including Scourie were sold in 1829, although the name is still common in the area.

The nearby island of Handa is a nature reserve and the site of a large seabird colony, including puffins, skuas, guillemots and razorbills. The Scourie estate is owned by Dr Jean Balfour. The palm trees in the grounds of Scourie House next to the harbour are claimed to be the most northerly specimens in the world not grown in artificial conditions. However, this is a popular misconception. The "palms" in the grounds are actually Cordyline australis, a native New Zealand tree which is found in lowland and montane areas. In the UK it is commonly referred to as "Torbay palm" or "Cornwall palm".

Being on the popular North Coast 500 (NC500) scenic route, the village has accommodation for tourists at a hotel with 21 rooms, bed and breakfasts and a campsite. Fishing, particularly fly fishing, is popular due to the large number of freshwater lochs that offer brown trout.

Scourie plays host to the home matches of shinty team, Kinlochbervie Camanachd Club and North Caledonian Football League side Scourie Football Club.

References

External links 
 Welcome to Scourie
 
 Panorama of Scourie Bay (QuickTime required)

Populated places in Sutherland